

Werner Forst (21 December 1892 – 3 February 1971) was a German general during World War II who held several divisional commands. He was a recipient of the  Knight's Cross of the Iron Cross with Oak Leaves of Nazi Germany.

Awards and decorations
 Iron Cross (1914) 2nd Class (1 October 1914) & 1st Class  (16 September 1916)

 Clasp to the Iron Cross (1939) 2nd Class (26 September 1939) & 1st Class (20 October 1939)
 German Cross in Gold on 14 March 1942 as Oberst in the 293. Infanterie-Division
 Knight's Cross of the Iron Cross with Oak Leaves
 Knight's Cross on 29 August 1943 as Generalleutnant and commander of 106. Infanterie-Division
 Oak Leaves on 22 February 1944 as Generalleutnant and commander of 106. Infanterie-Division

References

Citations

Bibliography

 
 
 

1892 births
1971 deaths
Military personnel from Magdeburg
Lieutenant generals of the German Army (Wehrmacht)
German Army personnel of World War I
Recipients of the Gold German Cross
Recipients of the Knight's Cross of the Iron Cross with Oak Leaves
People from the Province of Saxony
Recipients of the clasp to the Iron Cross, 1st class
German Army generals of World War II